Chenango County Courthouse District is a national historic district that includes a historic courthouse located at Norwich in Chenango County, New York.  The district has 45 contributing buildings and includes two parks, governmental buildings, cultural and commercial buildings.  Notable buildings include the Chenango County Courthouse (1837), Sheriff's office (1905), County Clerk's office (1852), First Baptist Church (1845), Maurice S. Ireland Building (1880), Old Norwich Hotel, City Hall (1903), and the Erie-Lackawanna Railroad Depot (1902).  Also in the district is the separately listed US Post Office-Norwich.

It was added to the National Register of Historic Places in 1975.

References

External links

Historic districts on the National Register of Historic Places in New York (state)
County courthouses in New York (state)
Historic districts in Chenango County, New York
National Register of Historic Places in Chenango County, New York
Courthouses on the National Register of Historic Places in New York (state)